Jean-Pierre Dufreigne is a contemporary French writer and journalist, laureate of the 1993 Prix Interallié.

Work 
1993: Le Dernier Amour d'Aramis, Éditions Grasset, Prix Interallié
2002: Louis XIV : Le lever du soleil
2003: Louis XIV : Les passions et la gloire
2007: Napoléon III - vol. 1 Un si charmant jeune homme... & vol. 2 L'Empereur qui rêvait..., Plon

External links 
 Jean-Pierre Dufreigne on Babelio
 Le débutant et la grande dame on L'Express (22 January 2003)
 Boire, dit-il on L'Express (24 octobre 1996)
 Jean-Pierre Dufreigne on Goodreads

20th-century French non-fiction writers
21st-century French non-fiction writers
Prix Interallié winners
Living people
Year of birth missing (living people)